Khayan is a rural locality (an ulus) in Bichursky District, Republic of Buryatia, Russia. The population was 151 as of 2010. There are 3 streets.

Geography 
Khayan is located 23 km west of Bichura (the district's administrative centre) by road. Ara-Kiret is the nearest rural locality.

References 

Rural localities in Bichursky District